"Outta Control" is a song by Baby Bash featuring Pitbull. It was released as a single in July 2009, and officially premiered on radio stations in June and reached the top ten on the iTunes top 100 in August.

Music video
Despite the song being popular in the mid-quarter of the year, the music video was shot in Toxic nightclub in Corpus Christi and was released in December. Quest Crew, the winners of America's Best Dance Crew season 3, made an appearance in throughout the video.

Chart positions

References

2009 singles
2009 songs
Baby Bash songs
Pitbull (rapper) songs
Arista Records singles
Song recordings produced by Lil Jon
crunk songs